The Adidas Cup was an annual football competition in South Korean football and the Korean League Cup held by the K League Federation from 1992 to 2002.

Format
The Adidas Cup is classified as a cup competition, but its format was similar to typical league until 1997. In 1998, 2001, and 2002, the participating clubs were divided into two groups, and the top two clubs of each group advanced to the knockout stage. In 1999 and 2000, it was held as a knockout tournament.

Finals

Awards

Top goalscorer

Source:

Top assist provider

Source:

See also
 Korean League Cup
 Korean League Cup (Supplementary Cup)
 Samsung Hauzen Cup

References

External links
Adidas Cup history at ROKfootball.com 

 
Korean League Cup